This is a list of notable car carrier shipping companies.

References

Auto